The following is a list of deaths in July 1991 of notable people.

Entries for each day are listed alphabetically by surname. A typical entry lists information in the following sequence:
 Name, age, country of citizenship at birth, subsequent country of citizenship (if applicable), reason for notability, cause of death (if known), and reference.

July 1991

1
Joost Baljeu, 65, Dutch artist.
Paulo Mendes Campos, 69, Brazilian writer and journalist.
Alfred Eisenbeisser, 83, Romanian football player.
Joachim Kroll, 58, German serial killer, necrophile and cannibal, heart attack.
Michael Landon, 54, American actor (Little House on the Prairie, Bonanza. Highway to Heaven), pancreatic cancer.

2
Bruno Engelmeier, 63, Austrian football goalkeeper.
Al Glossop, 76, American baseball player.
Don Houghton, 61, British television screenwriter and producer.
David Armine Howarth, 78, British naval officer, boatbuilder, and author.
Lee Remick, 55, American actress (Days of Wine and Roses, The Omen, Wait Until Dark), kidney cancer.
José María Rosa, 84, Argentine historian.
Ermanno Scaramuzzi, 63, Italian football player and coach.

3
Dolly Anwar, 43, Bangladeshi actress and writer, suicide.
Doro Levi, 93, Italian archaeologist.
Domingo Tarasconi, 87, Argentine football player.
Lê Văn Thiêm, 73, Vietnamese mathematician.
Sigismund Toduță, 83, Romanian composer, musicologist, and professor.
Ephraim Urbach, 78–79, Israeli scholar and politician.
Jimmy Van Alen, 88, American tennis official.
Bernard Waley-Cohen, 77, British businessman and politician.
Ernst Witt, 80, German mathematician.

4
Victor Chang, 54, Chinese-Australian surgeon, shot.
Ernie Hammerton, 64, Australian rugby player.
Henry Koerner, 75, Austrian-American painter and graphic designer, bicycle accident.
Hugo Lepe, 51, Chilean football player.
Art Sansom, 70, American cartoonist (The Born Loser).

5
Mildred Dunnock, 90, American actress (Death of a Salesman, Baby Doll).
Valentina Ivashova, 75, Soviet film actress.
Bob Kennedy, 62, American gridiron football player.
Nobuo Nakamura, 82, Japanese actor (Ikiru, Tokyo Story, The Human Condition).
Howard Nemerov, 71, American poet, cancer.

6
Raymond Boisset, 79, French sprinter and Olympian.
Léon Chertok, 79, French psychiatrist.
Dorcas Cochran, 88, American lyricist and screenwriter.
Nicholas P. Dallis, 79, American cartoonist (Rex Morgan, M.D.).
Renée Garilhe, 68, French fencer and Olympic medalist.
Victor Korovin, 54, Soviet and Russian painter.
Mudashiru Lawal, 37, Nigerian football player.
Stew Nairn, 59, New Zealand sports shooter and Olympian.
Thorley Walters, 78, English actor.
Anton Yugov, 86, Bulgarian politician, prime minister (1956–1962).

7
Suzy Prim, 94, French actress.
Ivan Spiridonov, 85, Soviet statesman and party leader.
Pete Williamson, 44, Canadian Olympic speed skater (1968).
Jan Wølner, 81, Norwegian pianist.

8
Gordon Stewart Anderson, 33, Canadian writer, AIDS-related complications.
William M. Callaghan, 93, American Navy officer.
James Franciscus, 57, American actor (Mr. Novak, Naked City, Beneath the Planet of the Apes), emphysema.
Geoff Love, 73, British composer.
Willie Nix, 68, American blues singer and drummer.
Prem Nath Wahi, 83, Indian pathologist, writer, and academic.

9
Danio Bardi, 54, Italian water polo player and Olympic champion.
Orhan Hançerlioğlu, 74, Turkish writer.
José Salazar López, 81, Mexican cardinal of the Roman Catholic Church.
Bill Miller, 66, American basketball player and college basketball coach.

10
Lycia de Biase Bidart, 81, Brazilian pianist, violinist, conductor, and composer.
Aase Bye, 87, Norwegian actress.
Jerry Leaf, 50, American businessman and cryonics pioneer, heart attack.
Grace MacInnis, 85, Canadian socialist politician.
Gerome Ragni, 55, American songwriter (Hair), cancer.

11
Osvaldo Carvajal, 76, Chilean football player.
Roger Christian, 57, American lyricist ("Little Deuce Coupe"), kidney failure.
Mokhtar Dahari, 37, Malaysian football player, ALS.
Atang de la Rama, 89, Filipino singer and actress.
Hitoshi Igarashi, 44, Japanese scholar and translator (The Satanic Verses), stabbed.
Morton Smith, 76, American professor of ancient history, heart failure.
Gale Wilhelm, 83, American writer, cancer.
Fehmi Yavuz, 79, Turkish civil servant, academic, and writer.

12
Frederick Allen Aldrich, 64, American marine biologist.
Luce Guilbeault, 56, Canadian actress, cancer.
Chaudhry Naseer Ahmad Malhi, 79, Pakistani politician.
Francis Mugavero, 77, American Roman Catholic prelate, heart attack.
Ken Yackel, 61, American ice hockey player and Olympic medalist.

13
Jacques Geus, 71, Belgian racing cyclist.
Aldo Ghira, 71, Italian water polo player and Olympic champion.
Riccardo Lattanzi, 57, Italian football referee.
Ray McPharlin, 75, Australian politician.

14
Sir Godfrey Nicholson, 1st Baronet, 89, British politician.
Robert Clavel, 78, French art director.
Axel Eggebrecht, 92, German journalist, writer and screenwriter.
Ruth Haktin, 89, Russian-Israeli politician.
Pavel Morozenko, 52, Soviet actor, drowned.
Constance Stokes, 85, Australian painter.

15
Arthur Briggs, 92, American jazz trumpeter and orchestra leader.
Keith Brown, 78, American athlete, politician and businessman.
Bert Convy, 57, American game show host (Tattletales, Super Password, Win, Lose or Draw), brain cancer.
Roger Revelle, 82, American geophysicist, cardiac arrest.
Joe Turnesa, 90, American golfer.
Johnny Vergez, 85, American baseball player.

16
Meindert DeJong, 85, Dutch-American children's author.
Robert Motherwell, 76, American artist.
Albert Eide Parr, 90, Norwegian-American marine biologist, zoologist and oceanographer.
Frank Rizzo, 70, American politician, mayor of Philadelphia (1972–1980), heart attack.
Robert Templeton, 62, American artist.
Dwight Weist, 81, American radio announcer, heart attack.

17
Arthur Raymond Brooks, 95, American flying ace.
Harold Butler, 78, English cricket player.
William Wesley Peters, 79, American architect.
Angela Sidney, 89, Native Canadian author and storyteller.
Johan Vogt, 90, Norwegian economist and journalist.

18
André Cools, 63, Belgian politician, shot.
Bruno Mondi, 87, German cameraman and director of photography.
Ambrus Nagy, 63, Hungarian Olympic fencer (1956), traffic collision.
Hendrik Stroo, 63, Dutch Olympic canoer (1948).

19
Guillermo Bonfil Batalla, 56, Mexican writer.
Odette du Puigaudeau, 96, French ethnologist, traveler and journalist.
Charles-André Julien, 99, French journalist and historian.
Niilo Nikunen, 78, Finnish skier and Olympian.

20
Vugar Huseynov, 22, Azerbaijani soldier and war hero, killed in action.
Aleksey Konsovsky, 79, Soviet actor.
Joe Martinelli, 74, American soccer forward.
Rellys, 85, French actor.
Earl Robinson, 81, American composer, traffic collision.
Chithira Thirunal Balarama Varma, 78, Indian royal, Maharaja of Travancore (1924–1949), stroke.

21
Jasmine Bligh, 78, British television presenter.
Helen Meany, 86, American diver and Olympic champion.
Glauco Pellegrini, 72, Italian screenwriter and film director.
Maxie Vaz, 68, Indian field hockey player and Olympic champion.
Paul Warwick, 22, British racing driver, racing accident.
Allan Wilson, 56, New Zealand biochemist, leukemia.
Theodore Wilson, 47, American actor (That's My Mama, Good Times, Sanford Arms), stroke.

22
Jack Albright, 70, American baseball player.
André Dhôtel, 90, French writer, novelist, storyteller, and poet.
José Gómez-Sicre, 75, Cuban lawyer, art critic and writer.
John Human, 79, English cricket player.
Jack Reardon, 77, Australian rugby player.

23
Jūkei Fujioka, 57, Japanese actor and seiyū.
Nora Gal, 79, Soviet translator and literary critic.
Martin Hodgson, 82, English rugby player.
Peter Kane, 73, English flyweight boxer and a world champions.
Tadashi Katakura, 93, Japanese general.
Mikhail Yasnov, 85, Soviet politician.

24
Kaif Bhopali, 74, Indian Urdu poet and lyricist.
Howie Carter, 86, American baseball player.
Edmund Białas, 71, Polish football player.
Freddie Brown, 80, English cricket player.
Isaac Bashevis Singer, 87, Polish-American writer, Nobel Prize recipient (1978), stroke.

25
Eduardo de Guzmán, 83, Spanish journalist and writer.
Henri George Doll, 88, French-American scientist.
Lazar Kaganovich, 97, Soviet politician.
Arthur Knight, 74, American movie critic, film historian, and TV host.
Douglas Stewart, 78, British Olympic equestrian (1952).

26
Frédéric Dumas, 78, French writer.
Andrés Gómez, 77, Mexican basketball player.
Marie-Louise Horn, 79, German tennis player.
Maria Treben, 83, Austrian writer and herbalist.

27
Martin Attlee, 2nd Earl Attlee, 63, British politician.
Pierre Brunet, 89, French-American Olympic figure skater (1924, 1928, 1932).
Gino Colaussi, 77, Italian football player.
Xu Shijie, 70, Chinese communist revolutionary and politician.
Wolf Witzemann, 67, Austrian art director.

28
Suzanne Davis, 79, American figure skater.
Aad de Bruyn, 81, Dutch athlete and shot put champion.
Ray Felix, 60, American basketball player.
Jan Gonda, 86, Dutch indologist.
Wang Ming-Dao, 91, Chinese protestant writer, evangelist and dissident.
Al Huggins, 81, Canadian ice hockey player.
Elko Mrduljaš, 81, Yugoslav Olympic rower (1936).

29
María Antinea, 76, Spanish actress, vedette, and dancer.
Christian de Castries, 88, French general.
Yusuf Khattak, 73, Pakistani lawyer, politician, and intellectual,.
Albert Lord, 78, American academic.

30
William Ball, 60, American stage director.
Tom Bridger, 57, English racing driver.
Lee Eastman, 81, American business attorney, stroke.
Benny Grant, 83, Canadian ice hockey player.
Flora Steiger-Crawford, 91, Swiss architect and sculptor.

31
Miro Barešić, 40, Yugoslav-Croatian émigré and neo-fascist paramilitary, killed in action.
Charlie Beal, 82, American jazz pianist.
Charles Jonker, 57, South African cyclist.
Al Loquasto, 51, Italian-American racecar driver, plane crash.
Nikola Yordanov, 52, Bulgarian football player.

References 

1991-07
 07